Murray Harbour is a small harbor lying east of Cape Murray on the north side of Murray Island, off the west coast of Pefaur (Ventimiglia) Peninsula on Danco Coast, Graham Land. The name was used by whalers in the area in 1922.

Map

 British Antarctic Territory.  Scale 1:200000 topographic map. DOS 610 Series, Sheet W 64 60.  Directorate of Overseas Surveys, Tolworth, UK, 1978.

References
 SCAR Composite Gazetteer of Antarctica.

Ports and harbours of Graham Land
Danco Coast